Eudonia aplysia is a moth in the family Crambidae. It was described by John Frederick Gates Clarke in 1986. It is found on the Marquesas Archipelago in French Polynesia.

References

Moths described in 1986
Eudonia